Chaudangsi is a Sino-Tibetan language spoken in the Indian state of Uttarakhand.

Geographical distribution
Chaudangsi is spoken on the western banks of the Kali River, facing the Nepal border along Mahakali valley. This area is located in Dharchula and Munsiyari tehsils, Pithoragarh district, Uttarakhand, India (Ethnologue). Villages include Panggu, Rongto, Rimzim, Waiku, Monggong, Chilla, Song, Sosa, Sirdang, Sirkha, Rung, Zipti, Gala, Tangkul, and Syang Khola (Ethnologue).

References

Languages of Uttarakhand
West Himalayish languages
Endangered languages of India
Languages of Sudurpashchim Province